Kristian Adolf Fjerdingen (16 September 1884 – 5 February 1975) was a Norwegian gymnast who competed in the 1906 Summer Olympics.

In 1906 he won the gold medal as member of the Norwegian gymnastics team in the team competition. He was born and died in Steinkjer and represented the club Steinkjer TF.

References

1884 births
1975 deaths
People from Steinkjer
Norwegian male artistic gymnasts
Olympic gymnasts of Norway
Gymnasts at the 1906 Intercalated Games
Olympic gold medalists for Norway
Medalists at the 1906 Intercalated Games
Sportspeople from Trøndelag
20th-century Norwegian people